Holliday Clark Grainger (born 27 March 1988), also credited as Holly Grainger, is an English screen and stage actress. Some of her prominent roles are Kate Beckett in the BAFTA award-winning children's series Roger and the Rottentrolls, Lucrezia Borgia in the Showtime series The Borgias, Robin Ellacott in the Strike series, DI Rachel Carey in the Peacock/BBC One crime drama The Capture and Estella in Mike Newell's adaptation of Great Expectations.

Early life
Grainger was born in Didsbury, Manchester. Her maternal grandfather was Italian. Her first experience  of acting was at the age of five when she was scouted for a BBC TV series. She appeared in many TV shows and independent films as a child actor.

Grainger attended Parrs Wood High School from 1999 to 2006, and in 2007 began study for a degree in English literature at the University of Leeds. However, she eventually opted for the Open University.

Career 
Grainger's first acting role was at five years old in the BBC comedy drama series All Quiet on the Preston Front. Roles followed in Casualty, Doctors and Dalziel and Pascoe. Grainger played Megan Boothe in Where the Heart Is, Stacey Appleyard in Waterloo Road and Sophia in Merlin.

In 2011, she appeared in the television series The Borgias, playing  Lucrezia Borgia with Jeremy Irons in the role of Pope Alexander VI. The series, created by Oscar-winning Neil Jordan and shot in Hungary, ran for three seasons.

After her role as Emily in the film The Scouting Book for Boys (2009),The Guardian she played one of the Rivers sisters opposite Mia Wasikowska and Michael Fassbender in Cary Fukunaga's 2011 retelling of Jane Eyre, and had a minor role in Bel Ami alongside Robert Pattinson and Uma Thurman.

In June 2011, she was cast in the leading role of Estella in Mike Newell's film adaptation of Great Expectations, opposite Jeremy Irvine and Helena Bonham Carter. The movie, screened at Toronto International Film Festival 2012, had its European premiere as the closing night film of the BFI London Film Festival. She had a minor role in the 2012 film Anna Karenina as Baroness Shilton.

On stage, in 2013 she played a role in Disassociation, a play by Luke Bailey, at The Lowry in Salford, which received largely positive reviews In the same year, she played Bonnie Parker in the 2013 TV mini-series Bonnie & Clyde. She was one of the female leads in the 2014 film The Riot Club, adapted from the play Posh, alongside Max Irons. In the same year, she appeared on stage in a version of Anton Chekov's play Three Sisters at the Southwark Playhouse.

Grainger played Cinderella's stepsister Anastasia Tremaine in Kenneth Branagh's 2015 film version of Cinderella.

In 2016, Grainger starred in Disney's The Finest Hours.

In 2017, she appeared in a film adaptation of the novel Tulip Fever alongside Alicia Vikander. From 2017, she plays Robin Ellacott in the TV series Strike (aired in the United States and Canada as C.B. Strike) based on the novels by J. K. Rowling.

Grainger plays one of the two lead female roles in the feature film Animals, along with Alia Shawkat. Based on the novel by Emma Jane Unsworth, who also wrote the script, the film was directed by Sophie Hyde and filmed in Dublin.

In 2019, Grainger starred in the BBC conspiracy thriller The Capture.

Personal life
In May 2021, she gave birth to twins with her partner Harry Treadaway, himself a twin (brother of Luke Treadaway).

Philanthropy 
On 20 June 2016, World Refugee Day, Grainger, as well as Jack O'Connell, featured in a film from the United Nations' refugee agency UNHCR to help raise awareness of the global refugee crisis. The film, titled Home, has a family take a reverse migration into the middle of a war zone. Inspired by primary accounts of refugees, and is part of UNHCR's #WithRefugees campaign, which also includes a petition to governments to expand asylum to provide further shelter, integrating job opportunities, and education. Home, written and directed by Daniel Mulloy, went on to win a BAFTA Award and a Gold Lion at Cannes Lions International Festival of Creativity among many other awards.

Filmography

Film

Television

Theatre

References

External links 
 

1988 births
20th-century English actresses
21st-century English actresses
Actresses from Manchester
Alumni of the Open University
Alumni of the University of Leeds
English child actresses
English film actresses
English people of Italian descent
English radio actresses
English soap opera actresses
English stage actresses
English television actresses
English voice actresses
Living people
People educated at Parrs Wood High School
People from Didsbury